Lisa-Marie Woods (born 23 May 1984) is a Norwegian retired professional football midfielder and current assistant coach at Creighton University. She last played at Asheville City SC of the Women's Premier Soccer League as a forward. She has previously played for Asker SK and LSK Kvinner in the Toppserien FC Indiana & Ottawa Fury in North America's USL W-League as well as Kolbotn, Stabæk, and Fortuna Hjørring in Denmark's Elitedivisionen, BIIK Kazygurt in the Kazakhstani women's football championship, and Perth Glory in Australia's W-League.

Early life

University 
Woods played for Oakland University in Rochester, Michigan during her freshman year in 2003. She later transferred to Middle Tennessee State University, where she played in 2004. These periods were alternated with summer seasons in Norway with Asker FK in Toppserien. In 2008, she played for Ottawa Fury during the summer break for the Beijing Olympics.

Playing career

Club
Woods began her career at Trosterud and later joined Lindeberg; she then transferred to Vålerenga, and in July 2001 joined Asker SK on loan.  She scored in her first match on 21 July 2001 when Asker beat Røa 8–0.  Asker was a successful Toppserien team that in 2005 won the Norwegian Cup.  She also played on the losing side of the Cup Final in 2006 and 2007 with Asker.

On 23 January 2009 Woods joined the German club 1. FFC Turbine Potsdam, signing a contract up to 30 June 2010. Woods stayed for 2 months at the club and then joined the American club FC Indiana as a forward.  After a successful American season with many goals scored, she transferred back to Norway and the elite Toppserien club Kolbotn in August 2009.

In January 2010 Woods signed to play for Stabæk, Oslo. 2010 was a successful year for Woods, playing as a defensive midfielder for Stabæk. She finished the season with 13 goals, while Stabæk finished top of the Toppserien league. On 14 November she was awarded the Toppserien Player of the Year prize.

In January 2011 Woods left Norway to sign for the Danish club Fortuna Hjørring.  After a successful season in Denmark in the 3F league, ending in November 2011, Woods signed to start playing immediately with Perth Glory in the Westfield-W league in Australia. After her stay at Glory, Woods returned to play in the regular season for Fortuna Hjørring again. Upcoming summer break in the Danish League, Woods was offered to play with Ottawa Fury with Fellow Norwegian International Leni Kaurin. Ottawa Fury won the W-league and Woods was voted Ottawa Fury MVP. Upon completion of W-league season, she once again returned to the Danish League to play for her club Fortuna Hjørring.

15 November she returns to the W-League, after signing with the Lady Reds, where she re-unites with Kristy Moore and Melissa Barbieri with whom she played with at Fortuna.

In 2015, she played for Kazakh champions BIIK Kazygurt.

In 2017 she was back in Norway with Avaldsnes IL, playing 9 league games. She joined Asheville City SC in 2018.

International 
In 2003 Woods captained Norway in the UEFA Women's Under-19 Championship. Her team reached the Final in Leipzig, Germany, where they lost 0–2 to France. In October 2009 Woods was selected for the Norway women's national football team to play in qualification matches for a forthcoming championship. She played as a substitute against the Netherlands in a match that Norway won 3–0.

In 2010 Norway played 16 international matches to mid–November, including important qualification matches for the 2011 World Cup. Woods played in 13 of the matches, mainly as a defensive midfielder in a 4–4–2 formation, and scored five goals. She was withdrawn from the 2011 FIFA Women's World Cup squad with a hip injury. She recovered quickly from the injury as she returned to play for her club Fortuna Hjørring that same summer. Woods was called up to the national team again for the next Euro qualifications in Iceland where she earned her spot in the starting lineup again.

Coaching career 
In 2018, Woods joined the women's soccer coaching staff at Creighton University.

Personal 
Woods is of Scottish, Norwegian and Filipino descent; the daughter of Gregory James and Gunn-Karin. Her brother Scott is also a footballer and played for the Philippines U23.

Honours 
 2005: Winner Norwegian Cup with Asker FK
 All-‐American 2004/2004
 Mid-‐Con Newcomer of the Year
 Great Lakes First-‐team
 All-‐Mid-‐Con
 Great Lakes Freshman of the Year
 Team All-‐Great Lakes
 Mid-‐Con Offensive Player of the Week(Oct.20)
 MVP Asker Fotball Kvinner 2008
 Player of the year 2010
 Toppserien "Kniksen Prisen"

References

External links 
Profile and photo at club site
Profile on goblueraiders.com
Interview with Lisa-Marie Woods
 
Lisa-Marie Woods Official blog on Women's Soccer United

1984 births
Living people
Middle Tennessee State University alumni
Norwegian women's footballers
Norway women's international footballers
Norway women's youth international footballers
Norwegian people of Scottish descent
Expatriate women's soccer players in the United States
Sportspeople from Tønsberg
Expatriate women's footballers in Germany
Expatriate women's soccer players in Canada
Expatriate women's footballers in Denmark
Fortuna Hjørring players
Stabæk Fotball Kvinner players
Boston Breakers players
Adelaide United FC (A-League Women) players
Perth Glory FC (A-League Women) players
A-League Women players
National Women's Soccer League players
Expatriate women's footballers in Kazakhstan
Norwegian expatriate women's footballers
Middle Tennessee Blue Raiders women's soccer players
Oakland Golden Grizzlies women's soccer players
Expatriate women's soccer players in Australia
Norwegian expatriate sportspeople in the United States
Norwegian expatriate sportspeople in Germany
Norwegian expatriate sportspeople in Canada
Norwegian expatriate sportspeople in Denmark
Norwegian expatriate sportspeople in Kazakhstan
Norwegian expatriate sportspeople in Australia
Toppserien players
USL W-League (1995–2015) players
F.C. Indiana players
BIIK Kazygurt players
Avaldsnes IL players
Ottawa Fury (women) players
Association football midfielders
Women's association football midfielders
Expatriate footballers in Germany
Expatriate men's footballers in Denmark
Expatriate footballers in Kazakhstan